John Hendy may refer to:

John Hendy, Baron Hendy, English barrister
John Hendy (American football), American football defensive back
John Hendy, member of boy band East 17